Graham Walker may refer to:

 Graham Walker (motorcyclist) (1896–1962), English motorcycle racer, broadcaster and journalist
 Graham Walker (academic), American academic, professor, and president of Patrick Henry College
 Graham Walker (editor) (1946–2016), editor of The World Today magazine from 1995 to 2010
 Graham C. Walker (born 1948), American biologist
 Graham Walker (footballer) (born 1935), former Australian rules footballer

 Graham Norton (born 1963), real name Graham Walker, comedian

See also
 Walker (surname)